Universiti Islam Malaysia (Islamic University of Malaysia) - or UIM in short - is the first and only postgraduate-only university in Malaysia. The administration and academic offices are located in Petaling Jaya with its permanent campus currently under development.

UIM offers a wide range of undergraduate and graduate programs in various disciplines, including Islamic studies, Shariah law, education, economics, management, communication, science, and engineering. 

The university has six faculties, namely the Faculty of Quranic and Sunnah Studies, Faculty of Islamic Civilization, Faculty of Syariah and Law, Faculty of Economics and Muamalat, Faculty of Science and Technology, and Faculty of Education and Social Sciences.

Academics

Schools
 School of Finance and Management
 School of Law and Syariah
 School of Heritage & Civilization

Institutes & Centres 
 i-Wafa
 Dewan Al-Amir

UIM Libraries 
 CIMB Islamic – Primary Islamic Finance Library
 UIM Wisdom Library
 Al-Amiri Exclusive Collections

UIM Libraries which consists of CIMB Islamic – Primary Islamic Finance Library, UIM Wisdom Library and Al-Amiri Exclusive Collections were established to collect, preserve and disseminate the unique, rare and primary resources.

These libraries have been in operation since October 2015 with 3,000 volumes of print collection. Notable collections and subject strengths include the resources on Finance, Management, Wisdom, Law and Natural Medicine. In addition, there are more than 5,000 e-journals and e-books that are accessible from any computers on campus and other location off-campus.

Computers, wireless internet access, photocopiers, printers, group and individual study areas along with superb interior design makes the UIM Libraries conducive and ideal place to visit and study.

The libraries is open to students, lecturers, researcher and those who are interested in scholarly and quality resources. This libraries are open from 9:30am to 5:30pm on weekdays and from 12:00 pm to 4:00 pm on weekends. This libraries is also open to external parties with affordable membership fee.

External links 
 ^ Universiti Islam Malaysia official website: http://www.uim.edu.my/
 ^ Muhyiddin Gives Letter Of Consent To Universiti Islam Malaysia http://www.bernama.com/bernama/v7/newsindex.php?id=1056097
 ^ Sebuah Lagi Universiti Awam Diwujudkan: http://www.tv3.com.my/beritatv3/tajuk_utama/tajuk_utama_7_1406189066.html
 ^ UIM Cyberjaya Mosque: http://cyberview.com.my/property/property-development-property/upcoming/cyberjaya-mosque/

Universities and colleges in Selangor
Islamic universities and colleges in Malaysia
Educational institutions established in 1955
1955 establishments in Malaya
Private universities and colleges in Malaysia